Soltanabad-e Agh Ziarat (also Romanized as Solţānābād-e Āgh Zīārat; also known as Solţānābād-e Şowlatī, Solţānābād, Solţānābād-e Āqāzīārat, and Solţānābād-e Āqzīārat) is a village in Quri Chay-ye Sharqi Rural District, in the Central District of Charuymaq County, East Azerbaijan Province, Iran. At the 2006 census, its population was 336, in 63 families.

References 

Populated places in Charuymaq County